The Taming of the Shrew is a 1908 silent film directed by D. W. Griffith and produced by the American Mutoscope and Biograph Company of New York City. The 17-minute short, which is based on the play of the same name by English playwright William Shakespeare, was filmed in just two daysOctober 1 and 7, 1908at Biograph's studio in Manhattan and on location in nearby Coytesville, a borough of Fort Lee, New Jersey.

The blurb for the film stated, "if we could see ourselves as others see us what models we would become."

Cast (in credits order)
Florence Lawrence	... 	Katharina
Arthur V. Johnson	... 	Petruchio
Linda Arvidson	... 	Bianca
Harry Solter	... 	Katharina's Father

The rest of cast listed alphabetically:
Charles Avery	... 	Music Teacher
William J. Butler		
Gene Gauntier	... 	Wedding Party
George Gebhardt	... 	One of Bianca's Suitors
Guy Hedlund		
Charles Inslee	... 	One of Bianca's Suitors
Wilfred Lucas		
Jeanie MacPherson	... 	Wedding Party
 Charles Moler		
Mack Sennett	... 	Petruchio's Servant

See also
 List of American films of 1908

References

External links
 

1908 films
1908 comedy films
American silent short films
American black-and-white films
Films based on The Taming of the Shrew
Films directed by D. W. Griffith
Films shot in Fort Lee, New Jersey
Silent American comedy films
1908 short films
Articles containing video clips
American comedy short films
1900s American films
1900s English-language films